Céline Boutier (born 10 November 1993) is a French professional golfer.

Amateur career
Boutier won several international amateur events including the 2012 European Ladies Amateur Championship and the 2015 British Ladies Amateur. She played college golf at Duke University from 2012 to 2016, winning four events. She helped the team to an NCAA Golf Championship in 2014. In 2014, she was the Women's Golf Coaches Association (WCGA) Player of the Year and won the Honda Sports Award for golf. In her junior year, Boutier began working with Cameron McCormick, a swing coach known for his work with the PGA Tour's Jordan Spieth.

In late 2014 and early 2015, Boutier was the No. 1 woman in the World Amateur Golf Ranking. In September 2014, Boutier finished T-29th at the Evian Championship, an LPGA major in her home country.

Professional career
In 2017, Boutier captured two wins on the Symetra Tour (Self Regional Healthcare Foundation Classic and Sioux Falls GreatLIFE Challenge) as well as eight top-10 finishes. She became the third member of the 2017 graduating class to exceed $100,000 in a single-season earnings and was the first player from France to earn her LPGA Tour card through the Symetra Tour since 2013. After the Symetra Tour season concluded, Boutier played several events on the Ladies European Tour, winning the Sanya Ladies Open.

In 2018 she played in 25 events on the LPGA Tour and made 16 cuts, earning $319,577 and finishing 61st on the money list. She shot a 63 in the third round of the Thornberry Creek LPGA Classic, a career low round. She also won the Australian Ladies Classic, an event co-sanctioned by the Ladies European Tour and the ALPG Tour. She finished 10th on the Ladies European Tour Order of Merit while playing in only seven events.

In February 2019, Boutier enjoyed her first LPGA Tour win at the ISPS Handa Vic Open. In the final round, Boutier made a critical birdie on the 15th hole and showed "nerves of steel" to claim a two-shot lead and victory in the $1.5 million tournament. In doing so, she ended a long drought for French players on the LPGA Tour, becoming the first female pro from France to win since Patricia Meunier-Lebouc in 2003.

With the LPGA Tour on hold because of coronavirus, Boutier won the Texas Women's Open on 4 June 2020, edging out Texas native Cheyenne Knight.

Personal life
Boutier was born in France to Thai parents. At Duke University, she earned a psychology degree and had a minor in economics. She has a twin sister who does not play golf and a younger brother.

Amateur wins
2010 Skandia Junior Open Girls, Classic de Joyenval, European Girls Team Qualifying, Italian International Championship
2011 Annika Invitational
2012 European Nations Cup Individual, Internationaux De France Juniors (Trophee Esmond), German International Amateur, European Ladies Amateur Championship
2014 Bryan National Collegiate, PING - ASU Invitational, ACC Championship
2015 British Ladies Amateur
2016 LSU Tiger Golf Classic

Source:

Professional wins (10)

LPGA Tour wins (2)

^Co-sanctioned with the ALPG Tour

Ladies European Tour wins (3)

^Co-sanctioned with the ALPG Tour

Symetra Tour wins (2)

Other wins (3)
2016 Fort Rucker Ladies Open
2020 Texas Women's Open, Kathy Whitworth Paris Championship

Results in LPGA majors
Results not in chronological order before 2019.

CUT = missed the half-way cut
NT = No tournament
"T" = tied

Summary

Most consecutive cuts made – 4 (twice)
Longest streak of top-10s – 1 (five times)

LPGA Tour career summary

^ Official as of 31 July 2022  

*Includes matchplay and other tournaments without a cut.

World rank
Position in Women's World Golf Rankings at the end of each calendar year.

Team appearances
Amateur
European Girls' Team Championship (representing France): 2010 (winners), 2011 (winners)
Vagliano Trophy (representing the Continent of Europe): 2011 (winners), 2013 (winners), 2015 (winners)
Junior Solheim Cup (representing Europe): 2011 (tie)
Espirito Santo Trophy (representing France): 2012, 2014
European Ladies' Team Championship (representing France): 2013, 2014 (winners)

Source:

Professional
Solheim Cup (representing Europe): 2019 (winners), 2021 (winners)

Solheim Cup record

References

External links

French female golfers
LPGA Tour golfers
Ladies European Tour golfers
Winners of ladies' major amateur golf championships
Olympic golfers of France
Golfers at the 2020 Summer Olympics
Duke Blue Devils women's golfers
People from Antony, Hauts-de-Seine
People from Montrouge
Golfers from Dallas
French people of Thai descent
1993 births
Living people